Shaaraim ( Šaʿărayīm), possibly meaning "Two Gates", is an Israelite city mentioned several times in the Hebrew Bible and the Old Testament. It has been identified by some with Khirbet Qeiyafa, an archaeological site on a hilltop overlooking the Elah Valley in the Judean hills.

Biblical references
The city appears in the city list of Judah's tribal inheritance, after Socoh and Azekah. After David killed Goliath, the Philistines ran away and were slain on the "road to She'arayim". In the city list of the tribe of Simeon, She'arayim is mentioned as one of the cities "unto the reign of David".

Identification with Kh. Qeiyafa
After excavating the site, Yosef Garfinkel of Hebrew University of Jerusalem and others believe that Khirbet Qeiyafa is She'arayim. Field work uncovered a wall that makes a nearly complete circuit with two gates. Garfinkel says it is the only contender for She'arayim as all other sites dated to the period have a single city gate. Carbon dating and the absence of pig bones strengthen Garfinkel's argument that Qeiyafa is Israelite She'aryaim and not a Canaanite fortress.

Israel Finkelstein disagrees. He claims that Megiddo and several other ancient towns in that region had two gates.

Nadav Na'aman of Tel Aviv University doubts that Sha'arayim means "two gates" at all, citing multiple scholarly opinions that the suffix -ayim in ancient place names is not the dual suffix used for ordinary words. Na'aman proposes instead that the name means just "gate", perhaps "because it was located on the western border of Judah with Philistia, a place that was seen as the gateway to the kingdom of Judah."

References

Hebrew Bible cities
Archaeological sites in Israel
Valley of Elah